Pochinok is a rural locality (a village) in Kubenskoye  Rural Settlement, Vologodsky District, Vologda Oblast, Russia. The population was 2 as of 2002.

Geography 
The distance to Vologda is 57 km, to Kubenskoye is 25 km. Pavshino is the nearest rural locality.

References 

Rural localities in Vologodsky District